The  Type 039A submarine (NATO reporting name: Yuan class) is a class of diesel-electric submarine in China's People's Liberation Army Navy. It is China's first AIP powered submarine and presumed to be one of the quietest diesel-electric submarine classes in service. This class is the successor of the Type 039 submarine. The official Chinese designation is 039A as the ship is based on the 039 class, but as the 039A has very little resemblance to the 039 it is commonly referred to as the Type 041. The class is designed to replace the aging Type 033 (Romeo class) and the older Type 035 submarines that previously formed the backbone of the conventional submarine force.

According to an early assessment by the US Naval Institute, the Yuan class was primarily designed as "an anti-ship cruise missile (ASCM) platform capable of hiding submerged for long periods of time in difficult to access shallow littorals." However, another assessment by USNI includes an open-ocean capability which can be used beyond coastal waters. Also updated was its role within China's naval fleet, and as of August 2015 it is considered to be a more traditional attack submarine, with a secondary ASCM role.

Design

Hull
The Type 039A inherits the tail design of the Type 039 (NATO codename: Song class) with upper and lower rudders and sternplanes with a single propeller shaft. A pair of fairwater dive planes are positioned in the on the sail. The submarine is equipped with indigenously developed machinery rafts (shock absorbers) system that helped to reduce noise level by over 35 dB. Additionally, the submarine is covered with rubber anti-sonar anechoic tiles to reduce the risk of acoustic detection. A new improved "C" variant was also launched.

Armament
The Type 039A has six  torpedo tubes. These can be used to launch indigenous torpedoes such as the Yu-6 as well as Russian-made torpedoes. It is speculated that it will be equipped with the supersonic YJ-18. The general designer of the torpedo and missile launching system is Sun Zhuguo (孙柱国). The Type 039A is also believed to be capable of launching YJ-8X (C-80X) series anti-ship missiles. The missile uses inertial + terminal active radar guidance. The Type 039A is also capable of firing the CY-1 anti-submarine warfare (ASW) missile under water, but the status of the missile is in question because nothing is heard about its production.

Combat control systems
China was known to have imported the Thales TSM 2233 ELEDONE / DSUV-22 and Thales TSM 2255 / DUUX-5 from France during the 1980s and early 1990s. Comparable systems are expected to be copied for the Type 039A. It is likely to be fitted with a comparable surface/air search radar similar to the MRK-50 SNOOP TRAY, a commercial navigation radar like a Furuno unit observed on a number of SONG class and ESM system is comparable to the Type 921A.

Propulsion
According to the Chinese newspaper Science and Technology Daily (科技日报), this 039A class is equipped with an air-independent propulsion system developed by the 711th Research Institute of the China Shipbuilding Heavy Industry Group Corp. Referred as a "specialized engine" in official Chinese sources. The 711th Institute was founded in April 1963, but it was not until more than a decade later, in 1975, that it ventured into the field of air-independent propulsion systems by establishing an office for a "specialized engine," setting up a team of about a dozen researchers.

The 711 Research Institute saw this special engine research process as an opportunity to train large numbers of technicians. Starting with fewer than 10 individuals at the outset, the project has grown to a team of over 100.  In 1998, the first experimental sample was built and a decade later and after a dozen technological breakthroughs, a wide range of matured versions became commercially available and the newest diesel-electric submarine in Chinese navy became the first customer.  Although the official Chinese source had not mentioned the exact class of the submarine, it is generally accepted that the class is no other than Type 039A Yuan class, since it is the newest conventional powered submarine in the Chinese navy.  The engine is built by Shanghai Qiyao Propulsion Technology Ltd. (上海齐耀动力技术有限公司), a wholly owned subsidiary of the 711th Institute.

Noise 

The Yuan-class SSK is integrated with advanced noise reduction techniques including anechoic tiles, passive/active noise reduction, asymmetrical seven-blade skewed propeller, the 039A is expected to be as quiet as other modern diesel-electric submarines, which are difficult to track.

Chinese specific variants

A total of four variants of Type 039A have been developed by the first half of 2014, and they are listed here in chronological order based on their public debut:
 Type 039A: Original Yuan class. The most obvious external visual difference between Type 039A and its predecessor Type 039/039G Song-class submarine is in the conning tower. The conning tower of Type 039A is similar to that of Type 039G, but the tower lacks the fin-shaped extrusion on the rear section of the conning towers of both the Type 039 and the Type 039G.
 Type 039AG: This second member of Type 039A series is frequently but erroneously identified as its development, Type 039B, because externally, the two version looks the same above waterline. The only difference lies below the waterline, which is not readily observed, and it is believed that all Type 039AG have been converted to Type 039B. The most obvious external visual difference between Type 039AG along with its development Type 039B and earlier Type 039A submarine is also in the conning tower: the shape edge at the top of conning tower of Type 039A is replaced with smooth round shape transition. In addition, there is a bulge in the middle of the smooth transition in the forward portion of the conning tower housing some kind of sensor, and this is a new feature earlier Type 039A lacks.
 Type 039B: This third member of Type 039A series looks identical to earlier Type 039AG from which it is developed from. The biggest difference between Type 039B and Type 039AG is that Type 039B has incorporated flank sonar array, which was subsequently retrofitted on Type 039AG and some earlier boats. This difference, however, is not readily observable because the flank array is installed at the lower portion of the hull. It was only in the early 2010s when a Type 039B built by Shanghai Changxing (长兴) Shipyard exposed in the berth, when the flank array of Type 039B became publicized, thus distinguish the type from earlier Type 039AG that lacked the flank sonar.
In addition, the bulge housing unknown sensors on board Type 039B in the forward section of the top edge of the conning tower is absent on the new boat launched in April 2014, but there are three white lines at the top of edge of the conning tower on both sides, presumably for environmental sensors. This new boat is claimed to be an upgraded variant of Type 039B.
 Type 039C: Variant with redesigned stealth sail. First spotted in May 2021 in Wuhan.

Export variant: S20
At IDEX-2013, China revealed a scaled-down version of Type 039A submarine designated as S20, specially intended for export. The main difference between S20 and Type 039A is that the AIP system on the original Type 039A is deleted, but can be available and easily integrated due to modular design of S20, if potential customers choose to purchase AIP systems separately.  Due to its modular design, a variety of sensors and weapons can also be easily adopted up on customers' requests.
Specifications of S20:
Structure: double hulled
Length: 66 meter
Beam: 8 meter
Draft: 8.2 meter
Surface displacement: 1,850 tons
Submerged displacement: 2,300 tons
Maximum speed: 18 knots
Cruise speed: 16 knots
Range: 8000 nautical miles at 16 knots
Endurance: 60 days
Crew: 38 total
Maximum depth: 300 meters

Export 

 :- 
On 2 July 2015, the Royal Thai Navy (RTN) formally selected China's Yuan-class (Type 041) platform to meet a requirement for three submarines. The RTN's procurement committee voted unanimously in favour of purchasing the submarine, which has been designated S26T (Thailand), a modified export version of the Yuan class. On 1 July 2016, the RTN submitted a funding plan for its 36 billion baht submarine procurement project to the cabinet for consideration with the expenditure to be spread over 11 years. If approved, the first submarine would be bought for 13 billion baht between fiscal years 2017–2021. The second and third submarines would be purchased during the remainder of the 11-year period. In May 2017, the Royal Thai Navy and Thai Government signed a contract for one S26T variant of the submarine in a $390 million deal. Orders for an additional two submarines are expected in the coming years. Steel cutting ceremony of the first S26T submarine was held on 4 September 2018 at Wuhan, China.

 :- (See Also : Hangor-class submarine)
In April 2015, the Government of Pakistan approved purchase of 8 export version of Type 039B (Upgraded) from China for $5 billion for the Pakistan Navy. The deal was finalised on 23 July 2015. In October of the same year, it was revealed that four of the eight of the submarines will be built in Pakistan, with work beginning in both nations simultaneously. Pakistan's Minister for Defense Production confirmed that the agreement included transfer-of-technology to construct the vessels. On 6 July 2015, Tanveer Hussain, minister of defence production, announced two projects for the construction of four submarines in China and four in Pakistan will begin simultaneously. Hussain added that a training centre will also be created at KSEW. In late 2016 it was officially confirmed that China will see about four submarines delivered by 2023 and the remainder delivered by 2028.

See also
 List of submarine classes in service
 Type 032 (Qing-class) submarine
  - A class of diesel-electric attack-submarines being built for Russia.
 Type 212 submarine - A class of diesel-electric attack-submarines developed by ThyssenKrupp Marine Systems and exclusively built for the German Navy, the Italian Navy and the Royal Norwegian Navy.
 Type 214 submarine - A class of export-oriented diesel-electric attack-submarines, also developed by ThyssenKrupp Marine Systems and currently operated by the Hellenic Navy, the Portuguese Navy, the Republic of Korea Navy and the Turkish Naval Forces.
 Type 218SG submarine - A class of extensively-customised diesel-electric attack-submarines developed ThyssenKrupp Marine Systems and currently operated by the Republic of Singapore Navy.
  - A class of extensively-customised diesel-electric attack-submarines developed by ThyssenKrupp Marine Systems and currently operated by Israel.
  - A unique class of  diesel-electric attack-submarines developed by ThyssenKrupp Marine Systems and currently being built for Israel.
  - A class of export-oriented diesel-electric attack-submarines, jointly developed by Naval Group and Navantia and currently operated by the Chilean Navy, the Royal Malaysian Navy, the Indian Navy and the Brazilian Navy.
 S-80 Plus submarine - A class of conventionally-powered attack-submarines, currently being built by Navantia for the Spanish Navy.
  is a class of submarine developed by Kockums for the Swedish Navy
 KSS-III submarine - A class of diesel-electric attack submarines, built by Daewoo Shipbuilding & Marine Engineering and Hyundai Heavy Industries and operated by the Republic of Korea Navy.
  - A class of diesel-electric attack-submarines, built by Mitsubishi Heavy Industries for the Japan Maritime Self-Defense Force.
  - A class of diesel-electric attack submarines currently being built by Mitsubishi Heavy Industries and Kawasaki Heavy Industries for the Japan Maritime Self-Defense Force

References

External links
  New submarine picture presents Chinese puzzle (janes.com)

Submarine classes